The following television stations broadcast on digital or analog channel 30 in Canada:

 CFKS-DT in Sherbrooke, Quebec
 CFTF-DT-9 in Gaspé, Quebec
 CHKL-DT-1 in Penticton, British Columbia
 CH5248 in Neepawa, Manitoba
 CIVO-DT in Gatineau, Quebec
 CKES-DT in Edmonton, Alberta
 CKWS-DT-1 in Brighton, Ontario

30 TV stations in Canada